Macrophilia is a fascination with or a sexual fantasy involving giants, most commonly expressed as giantesses (female giants), as well as giant objects. It is typically believed to be a male fantasy, with the male playing the smaller part; however, people with any background can have it. When the smaller part is male, they may be depicted as entering, being dominated by, or being eaten by the larger woman. Generally, depictions range from sexually explicit actions to non-sexual interactions while still providing sexual stimulation for those with the fantasy.

Online communities refer to this subculture as macro fetish or GTS fetish, an abbreviation of "giantess" and sometimes the backronym "giant tiny sex".

Description

Although macrophilia literally translates to simply a "lover of large", in the context of a sexual fantasy, it is used to denote attraction to beings larger than themselves. Generally, the interest differs between macrophiles, and depends on gender and sexual orientation. Macrophiles often enjoy feeling small and being abused, degraded, dominated, or eaten, and they often view the much taller being as powerful and dominating.

Psychologist Mark Griffiths speculates that the roots of macrophilia may lie in sexual arousal in childhood and early adolescence that is accidentally associated with giants.

Speculating on why there are not as many female macrophiles, psychologist Helen Friedman theorized that women who already view men as dominant and powerful have no need to fantasize about it. Still there exists a presence of women who can enjoy both aspects of macrophilia. Women who take on the roles of the giantess within this fetish often find the practice to be empowering and enjoy being worshipped.

Community

Internet

The internet has played an important role in helping to develop the fetish. The pornography site Pornhub's 2015 annual report showed that compared to 2014, the biggest increase in search topic was giantess, which had a 1091 percent gain in searches. There also existed an exhibit at the Museum of Sex titled "Kink: Geography of the Erotic Imagination" which explored many different fantasies, including macrophilia.

Online content creators have also developed homemade media that has helped grow the fetish's reach. In addition to generating content across websites, some content creators have even branded themselves in ways that helped them generate a following and gain revenue for their work. After data was gathered from 4,814,732 videos on clips4sale, an established porn site, it was found that "giantess" was the 34th most popular category.

The macro community has produced fiction writing, digital art, and collages on websites such as DeviantArt and Pixiv. Dedicated macrophilia websites include Giantess World and the Giantess City forums. Karbo, Eskoz, and AshkiiWolf are among the more popular artists.

Video games

Macrophilia video games have also been developed; Sizebox is a sandbox game in which players import models and create scenes. Resize Me! is an anime VR game in development; the player is gradually shrunken by their childhood friend and toyed with.

The popularity of Resident Evil Village's antagonist Lady Dimitrescu has been attributed to her giant size.

Real-world experience
One way macrophiles enjoy their fetish physically is by scheduling private sessions with extraordinarily tall women to engage in non-sexual interactions; trampling, lifting and carrying, foot worshiping, roleplaying and domination.

See also
 Amazons
 Crush fetish
 Giantess
 Lust
 Masturbation
 Microphilia
 Pornography 
 Resizing (fiction)
 Vorarephilia

References

Further reading
 
 

Size
Paraphilias
Giants